Aghiovit was a region of the old Armenia c. 300–800 ruled by the family Gnuni. In 772 was occupied by the Qayasite dynasty.

See also
List of regions of old Armenia

Early medieval Armenian regions